Rags is a BBC Books original novel written by Mick Lewis and based on the long-running British science fiction television series Doctor Who. It features the Third Doctor and Jo.

Premise
A strange group of musicians begins giving free outdoor concerts across the West of England, attracting a caravan of young, alienated followers. The Doctor investigates the unearthly forces behind the band and the odd acts of violence that follow in its wake.

External links

2001 British novels
2001 science fiction novels
Past Doctor Adventures
Third Doctor novels
BBC Books books